Oakdale, also known as the Isaac Mendenhall Estate, is a historic home located in Pennsbury Township, Chester County, Pennsylvania. It was built in 1840, and is representative of the home of a prosperous Quaker farmer of the mid-19th century.  The associated carriage house has a room known to have harbored freedom seekers on the Underground Railroad.

It was added to the National Register of Historic Places in 1972.

References

Houses on the Underground Railroad
Houses on the National Register of Historic Places in Pennsylvania
Houses completed in 1840
Houses in Chester County, Pennsylvania
National Register of Historic Places in Chester County, Pennsylvania
Underground Railroad in Pennsylvania